The  Ministry of Defence is the Iraqi government agency responsible for defence of Iraq. It is also involved with internal security.

Authority 
The Ministry directs all the Iraqi Armed Forces, comprising a Joint Headquarters, the Iraqi Ground Forces Command (which controls the Army), the Iraqi Special Operations Forces, the Iraqi Army, the Iraqi Navy (including Marines), and the Iraqi Air Force.

History 
The Ministry was dissolved by Coalition Provisional Authority Order Number 2 of mid-2003. It was formally re-established by CPA Order 67 of 21 March 2004. In the interim period, the CPA Office of Security Affairs served as the de facto Ministry of Defence.

The Iraqi Counter Terrorism Bureau directs the Iraqi Counter Terrorism Command, which is a further military force answerable to the Prime Minister of Iraq directly. As of 30 June 2009, there had been legislation in progress for a year to make the Iraqi Counter Terrorism Bureau a separate ministry.

Minister of Defence 
The position of Minister of Defence became vacant in the previous Iraqi cabinet, approved on 21 December 2010. While it was vacant, Prime Minister Nouri al-Maliki served as the acting defence minister. Saadoun al-Dulaimi later served as Minister of Defence from 2011 to 2014. Khaled al-Obaidi served as defence minister in the Iraqi cabinet of Prime Minister Haider al-Abadi. Juma Inad served as defense minister from May 2020 to October of 2022 under the caretaker government of Mustafa al-Kadhimi.  Thabet Muhammad Al-Abasi serves as the current minister of defense as of 2022.

The previous Minister of Defence, Lieutenant General Abd al-Qadr Muhammed Jassim al-Obaidi, is a Sunni career military officer and political independent. He had limited experience and faced a number of hurdles impeding his effective governance. Some of the major problems included inheriting a staff that is notorious for favorism, corruption, and deeply divided along sectarian and ethnic lines.  He was a rival of the former Minister of the Interior Jawad al-Bolani, National Security Advisor Muwafaq al-Rubai, and Minister of Staff for National Security Affairs Shirwan al-Waili. He has been criticized for not being able to stand up to the Badr Organization and Mehdi Army members which dominate his own party. In addition, as a Sunni he faced inherent challenges working within a Shiite-dominated government.

On 19 September 2005, The Independent reported that approximately one billion US dollars have been stolen by top ranking officials from the Ministry of Defence including Hazim al-Shaalan and Ziyad Cattan.

Previous defence ministers under Saddam Hussein's regime included Ali Hassan al-Majid ('Chemical Ali'). Iraq's first minister of defence was Jafar al-Askari (1920-1922).

List of Ministers of Defence

Kingdom of Iraq (1921–1958)

Iraqi Republic (1958–1968)

Ba'athist Iraq (1968–2003)

Republic of Iraq (2004–present)

References

Further reading

External links
 Ministry of Defence 

Defence
Iraq
Military of Iraq
2004 establishments in Iraq
Ministry of Defense (Iraq)
Defence ministers of Iraq